Yuton is an unincorporated community in McLean County, Illinois, United States.

Notes

Unincorporated communities in McLean County, Illinois
Unincorporated communities in Illinois